Luke Petros Jukulile (born 5 September 1973) is a retired Zimbabwean football (soccer) midfielder. He played professionally for Kaizer Chiefs, CAPS United, Lancashire Steel, Dynamos and Shabanie Mine and also represented Zimbabwe.

Kaizer Chiefs
In Jukulile's short spell at Kaizer Chiefs he scored a goal in the CAF Confederation Cup final against Interclube and Patrick Mabedi scored an injury time penalty in the 2nd leg final which they won.\

References

1973 births
Living people
Association football midfielders
Zimbabwean footballers
Zimbabwe international footballers
Zimbabwean expatriate footballers
Expatriate soccer players in South Africa
Zimbabwean expatriate sportspeople in South Africa
CAPS United players
Lancashire Steel F.C. players
Kaizer Chiefs F.C. players
Dynamos F.C. (South Africa) players